County routes in Ontario County, New York, provide main arterial connections that are not otherwise provided by state highways. County routes never enter villages or cities; instead, they usually terminate at the village or city line or at an intersection with another county or state highway. The posted road names of county routes in Ontario County are "County Road #"; other names for the roads are rarely posted and are thus infrequently used. The non-numerical name or names of the route are given in the "via" column below.

Routes 1–25

Routes 26 and up

See also

County routes in New York

References

External links
Ontario County Roads
County-wide Basemap

 
Ontario County